Mona Magdeleine Beaumont (née Mona Magdeleine Marx; 1 January 1927 – 29 August 2007) was a French-born American painter and printmaker. She is known for abstract and in a cubist-style work, with subject matter in non-objective figure and still life. Beaumont lived in Lafayette, and the San Francisco Bay Area for many years, and was an important figure in painting there in the 1960s.

Biography 
Mona Beaumont was born January 1, 1927, in Paris, France. Her birthday has also been documented as 1 January 1932. She attended University of California, Berkeley (B.A. degree) and Harvard University (M.A. degree). Additionally she studied under modern artist Hans Hofmann at the Hans Hofmann Studio. 

In 1946, she married William Gerald Beaumont, and together had two children.  

She received multiple awards including the Grey Foundation Purchase Award (1963), a prize at the Jack London Square Art Festival (1965), San Francisco Arts Festival Purchase Award and One–Person Exhibition Award (1966, 1975), and the Ackerman Award from San Francisco Women Artists Annual (1968).

Death and legacy 
She died on 29 August 2007 in San Diego, California. Her work is part of the collections at the Fine Arts Museums of San Francisco, and the San Francisco Arts Commission. the Bulart Foundation in San Francisco; Grey Foundation in Washington, D.C.; Hoover Foundation in Palo Alto, California; and the Oakland Art Museum of California.

Exhibitions

Solo exhibitions 

 1960 – Mona Beaumont, solo exhibition, Galeria Protea, Mexico City, Mexico
 1967 – Mona Beaumont, solo exhibition, Pomeroy Galleries, 449 Pacific Avenue, San Francisco, California; this exhibition travelled to Russia the same year.

Group exhibitions 
 1945 – group exhibition, Museum of Modern Art, New York City, New York
 1964 – The Square Drawing, group exhibition, San Francisco Art Institute, San Francisco, California
 1965 – group exhibition, 11th Annual Jack London Square Art Festival, Oakland, California
 1970 – Annual San Francisco Women Artists exhibition, group exhibition, San Francisco Museum of Art, San Francisco, California
 1975 – group exhibition, San Francisco Arts Festival, San Francisco, California
 1977 – group exhibition, 31st Annual San Francisco Arts Festival, San Francisco, California
 1977 – The 1975 exhibition award winners from San Francisco Arts Festival, group exhibition curated by Hayward King, Palo Alto Art Center, Palo Alto, California

References 

1927 births
2007 deaths
French emigrants to the United States
American women painters
20th-century American painters
People from Lafayette, California
Artists from Paris
University of California, Berkeley alumni
Harvard University alumni
Cubist artists
Abstract artists